Scott Michael Cross (born December 3, 1974) is an American college basketball coach who is currently head men's basketball coach at Troy. He is the former head men's basketball coach at the University of Texas at Arlington (UT Arlington), where he played college basketball.

Early life and education
Growing up in Garland, Texas, Cross graduated from North Garland High School in 1993. He attended the University of Texas at San Antonio for one year before beginning his college basketball player at Tyler Junior College in 1994–95. Cross then transferred to the University of Texas at Arlington, where he played at guard on the UT Arlington Mavericks men's basketball team from 1995 to 1998 under head coach Eddie McCarter. In 82 career games at UT Arlington, Cross averaged 9.3 points, 2.8 rebounds, and 2.7 assists. A two-time Academic All-American, Cross graduated from UT Arlington in 1998 with a bachelor's degree in marketing and 4.0 GPA.

Coaching career

UT Arlington assistant (1998–2006)
After graduating, Cross became an assistant coach at UT Arlington under McCarter in 1998. Cross helped UT Arlington share the 2004 Southland Conference regular season title. Following the resignation of McCarter, on April 21, 2006, UT Arlington promoted Cross to head coach.

UT Arlington (2006–2018)
Cross was head coach at UT Arlington from 2006 to 2018. In his second season, Cross led UT Arlington to the Southland tournament title and first ever NCAA tournament appearance. The Southland Conference named Cross Coach of the Year after UT Arlington won the 2012 regular season title.  Cross was also a Finalist for the Hugh Durham National Coach of the Year Award.  That same season,  UT Arlington appeared in the 2012 National Invitation Tournament.

In 2012–13, UT Arlington temporarily moved to the Western Athletic Conference (WAC) and finished the season 19–14 (11–7 WAC) with an appearance in the 2013 CollegeInsider.com Postseason Tournament. The following season, UT Arlington moved to the Sun Belt Conference.

During the 2015-2016 season, Cross was able to lead his Mavericks to big program victories over Ohio State and Memphis.  They would finish the season with a 24-11 record, receiving an invitation to the 2016 CollegeInsider.com Postseason Tournament, where they would beat Savannah State in the first round before falling in the quarterfinals.  Following the conclusion of the season, Cross was named a finalist for the Skip Prosser Man of the Year Award.

The 27–9 record in 2016–17 set a new program record for wins. That season, UT-Arlington defeated Texas for the first time on November 29. Then on December 8, UT Arlington upset no. 12 Saint Mary's 65–51, the first win over a ranked opponent in program history. The 2016–17 team won the program's first Sun Belt regular season title, for which Cross was named Sun Belt Coach of the Year.  UTA would receive an invitation to the 2017 National Invitation Tournament, where they would make it to the quarterfinals after defeating BYU and Akron. From 2014 to 2018, Cross coached power forward Kevin Hervey, who would be selected in the second round of the 2018 NBA draft and become the first UT Arlington player to play in the NBA.

Following a 21–13 season, Cross was fired on March 26, 2018, with UTA athletic director Jim Baker citing a need for new leadership in the program. In 12 seasons, he had a 225–161 record, for the most wins of any coach in program history. He is the only UT Arlington head coach with a career winning record.

TCU assistant (2018–2019)
A few weeks after his firing, on April 12, Cross was hired by Jamie Dixon to be an assistant coach with the TCU Horned Frogs men's basketball team.  While at TCU, Cross became Dixon's primary game plan strategist during the season.  Cross would help lead the Horned Frogs to a 23–14 record and an appearance in the semifinals of the 2019 National Invitation Tournament.

Troy (2019–present)
On March 26, 2019, Cross was named the new head coach of the men's basketball team at Troy University. Troy went 9–22 in Cross's first season as head coach.

Cross had his breakthrough season at Troy during the 2021-2022 season, when Troy finished the season with a 20-11 (10-6) record, winning the inaugural Paradise Classic tournament during the season and receiving an invitation to the postseason College Basketball Invitational.

Head coaching record

Personal life
Cross is married to Jennifer Harris, who played volleyball at UT Arlington from 1995 to 1998. They have three children.

References

External links
 Troy bio
 UT Arlington bio

1974 births
Living people
American men's basketball coaches
American men's basketball players
Basketball coaches from Texas
Basketball players from Texas
College men's basketball head coaches in the United States
People from Garland, Texas
TCU Horned Frogs men's basketball coaches
Tyler Apaches men's basketball players
University of Texas at San Antonio alumni
UT Arlington Mavericks men's basketball coaches
UT Arlington Mavericks men's basketball players
Virginia Commonwealth University alumni